Pita ( or ) or pitta (British English), is a family of yeast-leavened round flatbreads baked from wheat flour, common in the Mediterranean, Middle East, and neighboring areas. It includes the widely known version with an interior pocket, also known as Arabic bread (khubz ʿarabī). In the United Kingdom, Greek bread is used for pocket versions such as the Greek pita, and are used for barbecues to a souvlaki wrap. The Western name pita may sometimes be used to refer to various other types of flatbreads that have different names in their local languages, such as numerous styles of Arab khubz (bread).

History
Pita has roots in the prehistoric flatbreads of the Middle East. There is evidence from about 14,500 years ago, during the Stone Age, that the Natufian people in what is now Jordan made a kind of flatbread from wild cereal grains. Ancient wheat and barley were among the earliest domesticated crops in the Neolithic period of about 10,000 years ago, in the Fertile Crescent. By 4,000 years ago, bread was of central importance in societies such as the Babylonian culture of Mesopotamia, where the earliest-known written records and recipes of bread-making originate, and where pita-like flatbreads cooked in a tinûru (tannur or tandoor) were a basic element of the diet, and much the same as today's tandoor bread, taboon bread, and laffa, an Iraqi flatbread with many similarities with pita. However, there is no record of the steam-puffed, two-layer "pocket pita" in the ancient texts, or in any of the medieval Arab cookbooks, and according to food historians such as Charles Perry and Gil Marks it was likely a later development.

Etymology
The first mention of the word in English cited in the Oxford English Dictionary was in 1936. In Levantine Arabic it evolved into , (since Old Arabic /p/ evolved into /f/). Other hypotheses trace the word back to the Classical Hebrew word  (lit. "a morsel of bread"). It is spelled like the Aramaic , from which it was received into Byzantine Greek (see above). Hypotheses also exist for Germanic or Illyrian intermediaries.

In Arabic, the phrase  (lit. In Egypt, it is called  or simply  ("bread"), although other subtypes of "bread" are common in Egypt, such as eish fino and eish merahrah.

"Arabic pastry").

Preparation

Most pita are baked at high temperatures, which turns the water in the dough into steam, thus causing the pita to puff up and form a pocket. When removed from the oven, the layers of baked dough remain separated inside the deflated pita, which allows the bread to be opened to form a pocket. However, pita is sometimes baked without pockets and is called "pocket-less pita". Regardless of whether it is made at home or in a commercial bakery, pita is proofed for a very short time—only 15 minutes.

Modern commercial pita bread is prepared on advanced automatic lines. These lines have high production capacities, processing  silos of flour at a time and producing thousands of loaves per hour. The ovens used in commercial baking are much hotter than traditional clay ovens——so each loaf is baked only for one minute.

Culinary use

Pita can be used to scoop sauces or dips, such as hummus, or to wrap kebabs, gyros, or falafel in the manner of sandwiches. It can also be cut and baked into crispy pita chips.

In Turkish cuisine, the word pide may refer to three different styles of bread: a flatbread similar to that eaten in Greece and Arab countries, a pizza-like dish where the filling is placed on the (often boat-shaped) dough before baking, and Ramazan pide.  The first type of pide is used to wrap various styles of kebab, while the second is topped with cheese, ground meat, or other fresh or cured meats, and/or vegetables. Regional variations in the shape, baking technique, and toppings create distinctive styles for each region.

In Cyprus, pita is typically rounder, fluffier and baked on a cast-iron skillet. It is used for souvlakia, sheftalia, halloumi with lountza, and gyros. In Greece the word pita means "pastry" and is usually used for various cakes and pastries like spanakopita (spinach pie) and karydopita (walnut cake) unrelated to the English language "pita" flatbread. Traditional breads in Greek cuisine are leavened loaves, such as the round καρβέλι karvéli or the oblong φραντζόλα frantzóla. This style of pita flatbread, in the English language meaning of the word, is almost exclusively used as a wrap for souvlaki or gyros usually garnished with some combination of tzatziki sauce, tomatoes, onions, and french fries.

In Israel, Druze pita is very popular.  The Druze-style pita is filled with labneh (thick yoghurt) and topped with olive oil and za’atar.

In Bosnia, Croatia and Serbia, local style of pitta is known as lepina, somun or pitica, and is the most common bread serving with barbecued food like ćevapi, pljeskavica or grilled sausages. The word pita itself, on the other hand, is used for pie in the general sense in all local languages, and is mostly used for börek or various sweet phyllo pastry dishes (with the exception of baklava which is always called that).

See also

 Chapati, an unleavened flatbread from the Indian subcontinent
 Flour tortilla, a thin unleavened flatbread from Mexico
 Focaccia, a flat oven-baked bread from Italy
 Injera, a sourdough-risen flatbread from East Africa
 Khachapuri, a breaded cheese dish from Georgia
 Markook, an unleavened flatbread from the Middle East
 Matnakash, a leavened bread from Armenia (related to the Ramadan pita)
 Naan, a leavened, oven-baked flatbread from Central and South Asia
 Pită de Pecica, a round bread from Romania
 Rghaif, a pancake-like bread from Northwest Africa

References

External links 
 

Arab cuisine
Ancient Greek cuisine
Byzantine cuisine
Greek breads
Greek cuisine
Flatbreads
Balkan cuisine
Levantine cuisine
Middle Eastern cuisine
Turkish cuisine